Jaycob Megna (born December 10, 1992) is an American professional ice hockey defenseman currently playing for the Seattle Kraken of the National Hockey League (NHL). He was selected by the Anaheim Ducks in the 7th round (210th overall) of the 2012 NHL Entry Draft.

Playing career
As a youth, Megna played in the 2005 Quebec International Pee-Wee Hockey Tournament with the Chicago Mission minor ice hockey team.

After playing Midget Major U18 hockey for Team Illinois, and committing to play Division 1 hockey with the Nebraska–Omaha Mavericks, Megna signed with the Muskegon Lumberjacks of the United States Hockey League (USHL) on May 11, 2010. During the 2010–11 season, Megna was the co-winner of the USHL Scholar-Athlete Award for his 4.0 GPA at Mona Shores High School.

Megna then played three seasons with the Nebraska–Omaha Mavericks, during which he recorded 4 goals, 18 assists, and 40 penalty minutes in 105 games played. On April 4, 2014, Megna chose to forgo his final year of college eligibility when he signed a three-year entry-level contract with the Anaheim Ducks of the National Hockey League (NHL).

After attending the Ducks 2015 training camp, Megna was assigned to the San Diego Gulls to begin the 2015–16 season.

Megna made his NHL debut on April 6, 2017, against the Chicago Blackhawks. Despite the ability to become a free agent on July 1, 2017, Megna signed a two-year contract with the Ducks during the offseason. He recorded his first career NHL point, an assist, in a 6–2 win over the Montreal Canadiens on October 20, 2017.

Megna attended the Ducks 2018 training camp, but was placed on waivers for the purpose of assigning him to the Gulls for the 2018–19 season. In October 2018, Megna was named captain of the Gulls for the 2018–19 AHL season. After playing in 35 games and recording 13 points, Megna was recalled to the NHL on January 31, 2019.

After six seasons within the Ducks organization, Megna left as a free agent to sign a one-year, two-way $700,000 contract with the Vegas Golden Knights on July 1, 2019. Assigned to AHL affiliate, the Chicago Wolves, for the duration of the 2019–20 season, Megna added three goals and 10 points through 60 games from the blueline.

As a free agent, Megna was unable to attract an NHL contract, opting to continue in the AHL by signing a one-year deal with the San Jose Barracuda on November 2, 2020. On February 6, 2021, he was named captain of the Barracuda.

In July 2021, he signed a one-year contract with the San Jose Sharks. He made his debut for the Sharks on October 30, 2021, in a 2–1 win over the Winnipeg Jets. His first NHL goal came on January 22, 2022, in a 1–7 loss to the Tampa Bay Lightning. He re-signed a two-year contract with the Sharks on May 9, 2022.

On February 5, 2023, the Sharks traded Megna to the Seattle Kraken in exchange for a 2023 fourth-round selection.

Personal life
Megna comes from a family of athletes. His older brother Jayson is also a professional hockey center for the Anaheim Ducks, and his father Jay played collegiate and professional football. His mother, Jacqueline, was an All-American athlete in high school.

Career statistics

Regular season and playoffs

International

References

External links

1992 births
Living people
American men's ice hockey defensemen
Anaheim Ducks draft picks
Anaheim Ducks players
Chicago Wolves players
Muskegon Lumberjacks players
Norfolk Admirals players
Omaha Mavericks men's ice hockey players
People from Northbrook, Illinois
Ice hockey players from Illinois
San Diego Gulls (AHL) players
San Jose Barracuda players
San Jose Sharks players
Seattle Kraken players